Al-Makīn Jirjis ibn al-ʿAmīd, called the Younger, was a Coptic priest, theologian, physician and civil servant in the Mamluk Sultanate.

Life
Jirjis (George) was probably born in Old Cairo in the first half of the 14th century. He held a high position under the Mamluks, which he probably inherited. The title al-makīn means "the powerful" and had been held by an earlier member of the family, the historian Jirjis ibn al-ʿAmīd. The sobriquet "the Younger" serves to distinguish the two, who have often been confused by modern authors. Their family is called the Banū al-ʿAmīd ("sons of the ʿamīd"). Jirjis's brother, al-Asʿad Ibrāhīm, served as the secretary (kātib) of the Mamluk dīwān al-jaysh (army council).

Jirjis retired to live as a hermit in the monastery of Dayr al-Qusayr in the Ṭura south of Cairo. There he composed the work known as al-Ḥāwī. There existed an autograph copy dated 1398/1399. He died sometime after that.

Works
Jirjis wrote in Arabic. His main work, commonly known as al-Ḥāwī, goes by several different titles and subtitles in the manuscripts. It is a religious encyclopedia. In a modern copy, it runs to about 800 pages. It consists of two parts. The first contains an introduction on Christology followed by five chapters and the second contains a further six chapters. Each chapter is subdivided into three sections. It contains extensive biblical exegesis, as well as Coptic apologetics against Judaism, Islam, the Melkites and the Dyophysites. It contains a refutation of astrology and the theory of taḥrīf, the corruption of the Christian Bible. He argues that Christianity has grace instead of a sharīʿa.

Towards the end of the 15th century, al-Ḥāwī was translated into Ethiopic under the title Tälmid. In the Ethiopic tradition, it is attributed to "George, disciple of Antony the Syrian".

Notes

Bibliography

14th-century births
14th-century Egyptian people
14th-century Christian monks
14th-century Christian theologians
14th-century Arabic writers
Christian religious leaders from the Mamluk Sultanate
Coptic Orthodox Christians from Egypt
Coptic Orthodox priests
Coptic politicians
Coptic writers